California Fever is an American teen drama series that ran on CBS in 1979. The show featured a group of Los Angeles teenagers living an exotic life of the beach, romance, and music. The series was short-lived, airing only 10 episodes.

Prior to the first episode, the show was to be called We're Cruising.

Cast

Episode list

References

External links 
 

1970s American drama television series
1979 American television series debuts
1979 American television series endings
CBS original programming
American teen drama television series
Television series about teenagers
Television series by Warner Bros. Television Studios
Television shows set in Los Angeles
English-language television shows